FC Dynamo Moscow (FC Dynamo Moskva) is a Russian football club based in Moscow. Dynamo returned to the Russian Premier League for the 2017–18 season after one season in the second-tier Russian Football National League.

Dynamo was the only club that had always played in the top tier of Soviet football (along with Dynamo Kyiv) and of Russian football from the end of the Soviet era until they were relegated in 2016. Despite this, they have never won the modern Russian Premier League title and have won Russian Cup only once, in the season of 1994–95.

During the Soviet era, they were affiliated with the MVD (Ministry of Internal Affairs – The Soviet Militia) and with the KGB and was a part of Dynamo sports society. Chief of the Soviet security and secret police apparatus NKVD, Lavrentiy Beria, was a patron of the club until his downfall.

From 10 April 2009 the VTB Bank has been the owner of Dynamo after acquiring a 74% share in the club. Boris Rotenberg Sr. was chairman until he resigned on 17 July 2015. On 29 December 2016, Dynamo Sports Society agreed to buy VTB Bank shares back for 1 ruble. On 14 February 2019, Dynamo Sports Society agreed to sell the club back to VTB for 1 ruble. On 24 February 2022, the shares were transferred by VTB back to the Dynamo sports society.

Dynamo's traditional colours are blue and white. Their crest consists of a blue letter "D," written in a traditional cursive style on a white background, with "Moscow" written below it, partially covering a football underneath. The club's motto is "Power in Motion," initially proposed by Maxim Gorky, the famous Russian author, who was once an active member of the Dynamo sports society.

History

Foundation and Soviet era

Dynamo Moscow has its roots in the football Club Sokolniki Moscow.

After the Russian Revolution, the club eventually found itself under the authority of the Interior Ministry and its head Felix Dzerzhinsky, chief of the Cheka, the Soviet Union's secret police. The club was renamed Dynamo Moscow in 1923 but was also referred to disparagingly as "garbage", a Russian criminal slang term for "police", by some of the supporters of other clubs.

Dynamo won the first two Soviet Championships in 1936 and 1937, a Soviet Cup in 1937, and another pair of national titles in 1940 and 1945. They were also the first Soviet club to tour the West when they played a series of friendlies in the United Kingdom in 1945. Complete unknowns to the British, the Soviet players first drew 3–3 against Chelsea and then defeated Cardiff City 10–1. They defeated an Arsenal side reinforced with Stanley Matthews, Stan Mortensen and Joe Bacuzzi by a score of 4–3 in a match played in thick fog at White Hart Lane. They then drew 2–2 against Scottish side Rangers, meaning they completed the tour undefeated.

They continued to be a strong side at home after World War II, and enjoyed their greatest success through the 1950s. Dynamo captured another five championships between 1949 and 1959, as well as their second Soviet Cup in 1953. Honours were harder to come by after that time. The club continued to enjoy some success in the Soviet Cup, but has not won a national championship since 1976. Even so, Dynamo's 11 national titles make them the country's third-most decorated side behind Dynamo Kyiv (13 titles) and Spartak Moscow (12 titles).

Dynamo's greatest achievement in Europe was in the 1971–72 European Cup Winners' Cup, where they reached the Final at Camp Nou in Barcelona, losing 3–2 to Rangers. This was the first time a Russian side had reached a final in a European competition, a feat not repeated until CSKA Moscow won the UEFA Cup in 2005.

VTB Bank era (2009–2016) 

At the end of the 2008 season, Dynamo finished third, qualifying for the 2009–10 Champions League preliminary round. On 29 July 2009, Dynamo recorded a 0–1 away win against Celtic at Celtic Park, which gave them a strong advantage going into the second leg. However, Celtic comfortably defeated Dynamo 0–2 in Moscow to progress, sending Dynamo into the Europa League play-off round where the club was eliminated by Bulgarian side CSKA Sofia after a 0–0 away draw in Sofia and a 1–2 home defeat in Moscow.

In 2012, after a poor start to the season in which they lost their first five league games, Dynamo replaced interim manager Dmitri Khokhlov with the Romanian Dan Petrescu, who managed to pull the club out of the relegation zone into a position in the upper-half of the league table. The team was close to qualifying for a place in European competition, but a failure to win in the last matchday left them in seventh, two points below the last Europa League qualifier position. Despite his efforts, Petrescu's contract was terminated on 8 April 2014 by mutual agreement after a heavy loss to league outsiders Anzhi Makhachkala 0–4. As Dynamo Director of Sports Guram Adzhoyev stated, "Last year Dan drew the team from the complicated situation, lifted it to the certain level, but recently we have seen no progress." Petrescu was replaced by Stanislav Cherchesov as manager. Under his management, Dynamo qualified for the group stage of the 2014–15 UEFA Europa League in which they won every game before falling to Napoli in the Round of 16. Dynamo was only able to finish in fourth place in the 2014–15 season after a string of poor results in the latter stages.

In June 2015, Dynamo was excluded from 2015–16 Europa League competition for violating Financial Fair Play break-even requirements. As a result, VTB Bank proposed to transfer 74 percent of the shares of the club to the Dynamo sports society. Under the proposed plan, the society would own 100 percent of shares of Dynamo as it did in 2009, while the shares of the VTB Arena would still be held by the Bank. The move would allow the club to comply with the requirements of Financial Fair Play, and VTB Bank would continue to provide support to Dynamo to the extent consistent with Financial Fair Play regulations.

Manager Stanislav Cherchesov was replaced by the returning Andrey Kobelev, and many foreign players, such as Mathieu Valbuena, Balázs Dzsudzsák and Kevin Kurányi, subsequently left Dynamo. Several young Dynamo prospects, such as Grigori Morozov, Aleksandr Tashayev and Anatoli Katrich, who won the Under-21 competition in the 2014–15 season, were introduced to the first-team squad.

On 22 December 2015, Chairman of Dynamo's board of directors Vasili Titov announced that the shares had not been transferred to the Dynamo society; that FFP compliance rather than the share transfer was the top priority for the club; and that he expected the club to achieve compliance by April 2016.

After the winter break of the 2015–16 season, Dynamo won only one game out of 12 played in 2016 and Kobelev was fired with 3 games left in the season. On the final day of the season, Dynamo lost 0–3 to FC Zenit Saint Petersburg at home, dropped to 15th place in the table and was relegated from the Premier League.

In October 2016, with Dynamo leading the second-tier Russian Football National League at the time, the newly appointed club president Yevgeni Muravyov claimed that club's debts stand at 13 billion rubles (approximately 188 million euros) and unless a new owner is found shortly or VTB re-commits to covering the club's debts, the club might declare bankruptcy. That would have most likely meant the loss of professional license and relegation to the fourth-level Russian Amateur Football League.

Dynamo Society era (2016 to 2019) 
On 29 December 2016, Dynamo Sports Society agreed to buy VTB Bank shares back for 1 ruble. On 13 January 2017, VTB Bank announced they will sponsor Dynamo Sports Society to the amount of 10.64 billion rubles for the period from 2017 to 2019 (approximately 167 million euros as of that date). HC Dynamo Moscow and other teams of the society were also to be financed under that deal. On 1 February 2017, former club president Boris Rotenberg said that the 75 million euro debt the football club owes to Rotenberg's companies has been restructured and "is not harming anybody". On 12 April 2017, with 7 games left to play in the 2016–17 season, Dynamo secured the return to the top level Russian Premier League for 2017–18. That is the FNL record for the earliest a team secured promotion.

On 14 March 2018, Yevgeni Muravyov was dismissed as the club president due to unauthorized payment made as a "bonus" to a third company during the transfer of Konstantin Rausch from 1. FC Köln.

Return to VTB (2019 to 2022) 
The new stadium for the club, VTB Arena was completed in late 2018. Following that, the stadium majority owner and football club's major sponsor VTB Bank expressed interest in reacquiring the control over the club. On 14 February 2019, Dynamo Sports Society agreed to sell back the club shares to "Dynamo Management Company" (the company that owns the stadium and has VTB bank as the majority owner). The price was the same symbolic 1 ruble. On 26 April 2019, it was reported that the deal is close to be finalized formally, but the price for the stock increased to 10 billion rubles (approximately €138 million). This reported larger number includes accumulated debts and the cost of the club's training centre. (At the beginning of 2021, the club's chairman Yuri Solovyov said in an interview that Dynamo's debts were about 5.4 billion rubles. The then state of the club Soloviev called "shocking".) On 30 April 2019, VTB confirmed that the deal has been closed and formal price is 1 ruble, the debts outstanding from the football club to Dynamo society has been restructured to an 8-year term, and Yuri Belkin was appointed club's general director.

The 2019–20 season, their first back at the home stadium, started poorly and head coach Dmitri Khokhlov resigned after 12 games played with Dynamo in second-to-last position in the table. Under his replacement, Kirill Novikov, results improved and at the end of the season Dynamo finished 6th. That allowed Dynamo to qualify for European competition (UEFA Europa League) for the first time in 6 seasons.

However, at the end of September 2020, Novikov was dismissed after losing to Locomotive Tbilisi (UEFA qualification) and Khimki (RPL). Sandro Schwarz was appointed as the new coach on 14 October.

In the spring of 2021, the sports press started talking about the "revival" of the Moscow Dynamo. Since the appointment of Sandro Schwarz as coach, the team have won seven victories and four defeats in the Russian Premier League matches. The club's sporting director, Željko Buvač, has already described the start of the season as "great." The team finished the season in 7th place, despite gaining 50 points, which was the most points for Dynamo in the Premier League since the 2014–15 season.

Return to Dynamo Society (from 2022) 
On 24 February 2022, as a consequence of the 2022 Russian invasion of Ukraine, VTB Bank was sanctioned by the United Kingdom. On the same day, VTB Bank transferred the shares of FC Dynamo back to the Dynamo Sports Society.

After the invasion was launched, former Liverpool F.C. and Ukraine striker Andriy Voronin, who had been the team's assistant coach, left the club, writing that he could not work in a country that was bombing his homeland.

The club remained in second place in the 2021–22 Russian Premier League and at competitive points distance from first-place defending champions FC Zenit Saint Petersburg for most of the season before some late Dynamo losses allowed Zenit to secure the title with three games left to play in the season. The club also qualified for the 2021–22 Russian Cup final, their first Russian Cup final appearance since 2012. On the last matchday of the league season on 21 May 2022, Dynamo lost 1–5 at home to PFC Sochi and dropped to 3rd place, letting Sochi overtake them. Still, that was the first Top-3 finish for Dynamo since 2008. On 29 May 2022, Dynamo lost the Russian Cup final to Spartak 1–2, with Daniil Fomin missing a penalty kick deep in added time. Manager Sandro Schwarz resigned from the club after the Cup final.

Slaviša Jokanović was hired as a new manager on 17 June 2022. Several key starting line-up foreign players from the 2021–22 season left the club on loan or suspended their contracts before the season due to the continuing Russian war in Ukraine, including Sebastian Szymański, Nikola Moro, Fabián Balbuena, Ivan Ordets and Guillermo Varela. Dynamo took positions in the upper half of the league table, but below the top 3 during the summer/fall part of the 2022–23 season, not going on any long unbeaten or winless streaks. New Cameroonian signing Moumi Ngamaleu was the only Dynamo player selected for the 2022 FIFA World Cup squads (not counting Szymański and Varela who were loaned out before the season). Dynamo went into the winter break of the season in 4th place.

League position

European campaigns

UEFA ranking

FC Dynamo Moscow Women's team 

In December 2021, according to the strategy of the club, FC Dynamo Football launched Women's team, as well as Women's Youth team and Girl's section in Lev Yashin Academy. Sergey Lavrentiev, graduate of the club UEFA "A" licence holder and former "man at the wheel" of Russian National Women's team, Chertanovo and CSKA Moscow women's teams, was appointed head coach of the new-born first squad. Goalkeepers coach Vitaly Shadrin (alongside same duties at Russian National Women's team) and strength & conditioning coach Yulia Gordeeva have also joined the staff.

Lev Yashin Academy 

In 2021 the academy won both winter and summer championships in Moscow youth league, Club's League, being the only club to score more than 200 goals (2,85 per match) and conceding as well the fewest number of 47 goals. Soon after, Alexander Kuznetsov, academy's director since 2013 and since 2006 in the club, has overviewed the evolution of football education in the academy, precising that "we`ve stopped acquiring "running horses" in favour of footballers – creative, technically skilled and able to make right decisions on the pitch". Mr Kuznetsov has also mentioned the role in modern approach in the Academy of Juan Martinez Garcia, Spanish specialist, who had been working in the club for several years a decade ago. In March 2022, the academy and Higher School of Economics became official partners in education and research.

 Franchise
The club has a football Academy named after Lev Yashin (official site), created on the basis of the Dynamo youth team. In recent years, the owners of the club have seriously taken up its development. VTB Group has created an endowment fund with a capital of 5 billion rubles to finance the training of young footballers. The board of trustees of the fund is headed by the former prime minister of Russia, member of the board of directors of Dynamo, Sergei Stepashin.
In 2020, 13 graduates of the academy played for the main team of Dynamo.

In 2020, the academy began to develop a network of branches. The first branch was created in Makhachkala (Dagestan) and then in more than 15 Russian cities and towns. In August and September 2021, the latest franchise football schools of the academy were opened in Barnaul, in Belgorod, in Vladivostok, in Voronezh and in stanitsa Novotitarovskaya in Krasnodar Krai. The next branch, based on local "Junior" school of sports, would be coming soon in Nizhnevartovsk.

In August 2021, the club started providing online workshops as a manual to launch Lev Yashin Academy franchises in any Russian city.

 Endowment fund
In September 2021, Alexander Ovechkin, worldwide hockey superstar and former HC Dynamo Moscow forward, was named official ambassador for the endowment fund of Lev Yashin Academy.
Since September 2021, FC Dynamo Moscow has been launched marketing activities to promote the endowment fund of Lev Yashin Academy.  Within the first promo offer, 30% of the cost of official new kit is transferred to support young Dynamo players sustainability, and each kit's buyer could get a number and a name on it for free.

Since September 2021, each purchase in roubles, miles or bonus points by card of VTB Bank could be directly converted into a single donation for the endowment fund of Lev Yashin Academy.

Ownerships, kit suppliers and shirt sponsors

B2C Marketing 
 Fashion and Merchandise
In August 2021, FC Dynamo Moscow opened the official fanstore with sports and casualwear at VTB Arena as an integral part of club's renewed brand platform. In December 2021, premiere screening of "Legends of the Future", dedicated to Dynamo's stars Mikhail Yakushin, Konstantin Beskov and Alexei Khomich, was held at club's official fanstore.

The first ever vintage Dynamo's collection was produced in 2008 and then in the late 2010-ies. A new vintage fashion line was launched in August 2021 featuring heritage brand "Olovo".

In September 2021, iconic British designer Nigel Cabourn started cooperating with the club with a fashion line, which will be his first cooperation with a football club, in a view of FC Dynamo Moscow's centenary in 2022, because vintage has always been a source of inspiration for the designer. In February 2022, Nigel Cabourn presented the whole FC Dynamo Moscow casual range at Pitti Uomo, famous international men's fashion show, at Fortezza da Basso in Florence.

In October 2021, capsule collection, dedicated to Lev Yashin's anniversary, was shown in his favourite cinema, Pioner, in Moscow.

In November 2021, the club organized auction to sell all new collection retro shirts, presented by Dynamo's footballers before the kick-off of the home game with FC Khimki, held on October 22nd, the day of the anniversary of Lev Yashin, for the benefit of endowment fund of FC Dynamo Moscow.

In December 2021, the club launched its first full-range New Year's collection. In February 2022, in the way to promote the fanstore and the 2nd round of the championship, where FC Dynamo Moscow is running on the Champions League's 2nd place, the club offered a free ticket for each more than 5000 roubles purchase.

 "Dynamo Runners" club
In August 2021, "Dynamo Runners" club was launched to promote Dynamo's spirit on a larger scale. Running, fitness and healthy lifehacks in Moscow are scheduled for every new training of the club. Olympic champion Yuri Borzakovskiy has become one of the ambassadors of "Dynamo Runners" club together with top bloggers and other celebrities.

 Dynamo & VTB Bank day
In October 2021, Dynamo & VTB Bank day was dedicated to 92nd anniversary of Lev Yashin together with school students, invited to Dynamo's game against FC Khimki, won 4 to 1, and to the official club fanshop at VTB Arena. Communication with school students has been carried on in December 2021 within tours at VTB Arena for school students from Khimki.

 Cyber and high-Tech Marketing
The last home matchday vs FC Zenit Saint Petersburg at VTB Arena was powered by the first Augmented reality (AR) show within a football game in Russia.

 Dynamo Bookshelf

In February 2022, the club presented two books about Gavriil Kachalin and Igor Chislenko as a part of "Legends and Lives" serie. One year before, the club also published the book about Mikhail Yakushin.

 Social Media
In January 2022, according to Deportes y Finanzas, the club became the most popular Russian football team on YouTube in the year 2021.

 Charity
During the season 2021–22, the club upscaled its charity matchday activities with 100 roubles from each ticket and 20% of merchandise sales provided to numerous charity funds.

Rivalries

Since its establishment in 1923, Dynamo's historical rival has been Spartak Moscow. Clashes between the clubs were seen by their fans and more generally as the most important games in the Soviet Union for more than three decades, attracting thousands of spectators. (Ironically, however, on New Year's Day in 1936, it was a combined Dynamo-Spartak team that traveled to Paris to face Racing Club de France, then one of Europe's top teams.) Dynamo clinched the first-ever Soviet League by beating Spartak 1–0 at Dynamo Stadium in front of 70,000 spectators. Spartak responded by winning the championship the following year.

Stadium 

Dynamo's ground used to be the historic Dynamo Stadium in Petrovsky Park, which seated 36,540. In 2008, it was closed for demolition. From 2010 to 2016, Dynamo Moscow played their matches at the Arena Khimki, which they shared with their Moscow rivals, CSKA Moscow. They continued to play at Arena Khimki until 26 May 2019, when FC Dynamo Moscow officially "returned home," 
as they played their first match at the newly opened VTB Arena.

Average attendance 

In the 1st half of the 2021–22 season Dynamo recorded the best attendance at home among Moscow football clubs, according to official stats provided by Russian Premier League.

Honours

Domestic
Soviet Top League / Russian Premier League
Champions (11): 1936 (spring), 1937, 1940, 1945, 1949, 1954, 1955, 1957, 1959, 1963, 1976
Runners-up (12): 1936 (autumn), 1946, 1947, 1948, 1950, 1956, 1958, 1962, 1967, 1970, 1986, 1994

Soviet Cup / Russian Cup
Winners (7): 1937, 1953, 1966–67, 1970, 1977, 1984, 1994–95
Runners-up (9): 1945, 1949, 1950, 1955, 1979, 1996–97, 1998–99, 2011–12, 2021–22

Soviet Super Cup / Russian Super Cup
Winners: 1977
Runners-up: 1984

Russian Football National League
Winners: 2016–17

European
UEFA Cup Winners' Cup
Runners-up: 1971–72

Non-official
Ciutat de Barcelona Trophy
Winners: 1976

Atlantic Cup
Winners: 2015

Lev Yashin Cup
Winners: 2010

Players

Current squad
As of 28 February 2023, according to the RPL official website

Out on loan

FC Dynamo-2 Moscow
Following Dynamo's relegation from the Russian Premier League (which holds its own competition for the Under-19 teams of the Premier League clubs) at the end of the 2015–16 season, the reserve squad FC Dynamo-2 Moscow received professional license and was registered to play in the third-tier Russian Professional Football League, beginning with the 2016–17 season. Following the main squad's promotion back to the RPL, they stopped playing professionally in the 2017–18 season, with players returning to the RPL U19 tournament. Dynamo-2 returned to PFL for the 2020–21 season.

Notable players 
For further list, see List of FC Dynamo Moscow players.

USSR/Russia
 Viktor Anichkin
 Anatoly Baidachny
 Vladimir Belyayev
 Konstantin Beskov
  Aleksandr Borodyuk
 Aleksandr Bubnov
 Igor Chislenko
 Yevgeni Dolgov
 Oleg Dolmatov
 Valery Gazzaev
 Gennadi Gusarov
 Vladimir Kesarev
   Dmitri Kharine
   Sergei Kiriakov
 Valeri Kleimyonov
 Valery Korolenkov
 Igor Kolyvanov
 Viktor Losev
 Evgeny Lovchev
 Alakbar Mammadov
  Andrei Mokh
 Eduard Mudrik
 Aleksandr Novikov
 Vladimir Pilguy
 Viktor Tsarev
 Aleksandr Uvarov
 Andrei Yakubik
 Mikhail Yakushin
 Lev Yashin
 Gennady Yevriuzhikin
 Vladimir Beschastnykh
 Dmitri Bulykin
 Pyotr Bystrov
 Dmitri Cheryshev
 Igor Denisov
 Igor Dobrovolsky
 Yuri Drozdov
 Daniil Fomin
 Vladimir Gabulov
 Vladimir Granat
 Sergey Grishin
 Rolan Gusev
 Aleksei Ionov
 Andrei Ivanov
 Andrei Karyaka
 Aleksandr Kerzhakov

 Yevgeni Kharlachyov
 Dmitri Khokhlov
 Valeri Kleimyonov
 Andrey Kobelev
 Aleksandr Kokorin
 Denis Kolodin
 Sergei Kolotovkin
 Dmitri Kombarov
 Nikolay Komlichenko
 Yuri Kovtun
 Aleksei Kozlov
 Sergei Ovchinnikov
 Kirill Panchenko
 Aleksandr Panov
 Sergei Parshivlyuk
 Ruslan Pimenov
 Nikolai Pisarev
 Pavel Pogrebnyak
 Vladislav Radimov
 Konstantin Rausch
 Aleksei Rebko
 Aleksandr Samedov
 Igor Semshov
 Anton Shunin
 Igor Simutenkov
 Igor Sklyarov
 Alexey Smertin
 Fyodor Smolov
 Sergei Terekhov
 Oleg Teryokhin
 Omari Tetradze
 Aleksandr Tochilin
 Akhrik Tsveiba
 Konstantin Tyukavin
 Andrey Yeshchenko
 Roman Yevgenyev
 Artur Yusupov
 Arsen Zakharyan
 Yuriy Zhirkov
 Roman Zobnin
Former USSR countries
 Roman Berezovsky
 Vali Gasimov
 Dmitriy Kramarenko
 Ramil Sheydayev
 Stanislaw Drahun
 Vasily Khomutovsky

 Aliaksandr Kulchiy
 Pavel Nyakhaychyk
 Maksim Romaschenko
 Igor Shitov
 Aleh Shkabara
 Sergei Shtanyuk
 Gennady Tumilovich
 Otar Khizaneishvili
 Saba Sazonov
 Kakhaber Tskhadadze
 Ruslan Baltiev
 Andrei Karpovich
 Andrejs Prohorenkovs
 Fedor Černych
 Deividas Česnauskis
 Edgaras Česnauskis
 Mindaugas Kalonas
 Žydrūnas Karčemarskas
 Arūnas Klimavičius
 Robertas Poškus
 Deividas Šemberas
 Tomas Tamošauskas
 Darius Žutautas
 Valeriu Andronic
 Alexandru Epureanu
 Yuri Kalitvintsev
 Maxym Levitsky
 Ivan Ordets
 Vyacheslav Sviderskyi
 Andriy Voronin
Europe
 Jakob Jantscher
 Zvjezdan Misimović
 Toni Šunjić
 Tsvetan Genkov
 Tomislav Dujmović
 Nikola Moro
 Gordon Schildenfeld
 Erich Brabec
 Martin Hašek
 Stanislav Vlček
 Boris Rotenberg
 Moshtagh Yaghoubi
 Mathieu Valbuena
 Kevin Kurányi
   Roman Neustädter
 Giourkas Seitaridis

 Balázs Dzsudzsák
 Eli Dasa
 Radoslav Batak
 Fatos Bećiraj
 Jovan Tanasijević
 Otman Bakkal
 Mathias Normann
 Marcin Kowalczyk
 Sebastian Szymański
 Costinha
 Custódio Castro
 Danny
 Jorge Ribeiro
 Maniche
 Nuno Frechaut
 George Florescu
 Adrian Ropotan
 Marko Lomić
  Ognjen Koroman
 Michal Hanek
 Zsolt Hornyák
 Tomáš Hubočan
 Martin Jakubko
 Oscar Hiljemark
 Sebastian Holmén
South America
 Leandro Fernández
 Thiago Silva
 Christian Noboa
 Fabián Balbuena
 Andrés Mendoza
 Diego Laxalt
 Guillermo Varela
Africa
 Charles Kaboré
 Clinton N'Jie
 Moumi Ngamaleu
 Christopher Samba
 Baffour Gyan
 Cícero
 Samba Sow
 Joseph Enakarhire
 Sylvester Igboun
 Patrick Ovie
 Pascal Mendy
Asia and Oceania
 Luke Wilkshire

Most appearances

Most goals

One-club men

Coaching and medical staff

Former head coaches

Gallery

Personnel

Club management

Presidents
In the Dynamo organization, the position of "president" has not always been present; several times the head of the club was titled as "chief executive officer (CEO)," or general director.

References

External links 

 FCDM.RU – official site
 fcdin – official fan site

 
Football
Football clubs in Moscow
Association football clubs established in 1923
1923 establishments in Russia
Soviet Top League clubs
Police association football clubs in Russia